Whiteman Creek is a creek located in the Okanagan Region of British Columbia.  The creek flows into Okanagan Lake from the west.  The only settlement on the creek is on its delta, the gated community of Parker Cove.

History
Whiteman Creek was discovered in the 1870s.  The creek has been mined.

References

External links
 

Rivers of the Okanagan